The Coptic Museum is a museum in Coptic Cairo, Egypt with the largest collection of Coptic Christian artifacts in the world. It was founded by Marcus Simaika in 1908 to house Coptic antiquities. The museum traces the history of Egypt from its beginnings to the present day. It was erected on 8,000 square meter land offered by the Coptic Orthodox Church, under the guardianship of Pope Cyril V.

The Coptic museum houses the world's most important examples of Coptic art.

History
In 1908, after receiving approval and a number of silver antiquities from Patriarch Cyril V and raising funds by public subscription, Marcus Simaika Pasha built the Coptic Museum and inaugurated it on 14 March 1910. The Coptic community was generous in their support of the museum, donating many vestments, frescoes, and icons. In 1931 the Coptic Museum became a state museum, under the jurisdiction of the Department of Antiquities, and in 1939 the collection of Christian antiquities in the Egyptian Museum was moved there. These were housed in the New Wing, completed in 1944. Because of damage, the Old Wing was closed in 1966, and the entire museum was renovated between 1983 and 1984. The foundations of the museum were strengthened and reinforced between 1986 and 1988, which helped the museum survive the 1992 earthquake. Further renovations took place in 2005–06.

Marcus Simaika Pasha was followed by Dr Togo Mina and then by Dr Pahor Labib, the first to have the title of Director of the Coptic Museum. Besides the museum buildings, there are gardens and courtyards and the area is surrounded by old Coptic churches. There are six churches, some which have origins as early as the 5th century AD. These old edifices include the (Hanging church) of the Virgin Mary and the church of St. Sergius.

The Coptic Museum's grounds are a peaceful and tranquil place. Its airy building is paved with mosaics and decorated with old mashrabiya screens. The museum houses an extensive collection of objects from the Christian era, which links the Pharaonic and Islamic periods. The artefacts on display illustrate a period of Egypt's history which is often neglected and they show how the artistic development of the Coptic culture was influenced by the pharaonic, Graeco-Roman and Islamic cultures. The museum was renovated in the early 1980 with two new annexes, which with the original aisles, houses the collection of 16,000 artefacts arranged in chronological order through twelve sections.

Collection 

The Coptic Museum contains the world's largest collection of Coptic artifacts and artwork. Coptic monuments display a rich mixture of Egyptian, Greek, Roman, Byzantine and Ottoman traditions, linking ancient and Islamic Egypt.

The objects are grouped into different mediums, such as stonework, woodwork, metalwork, textiles and manuscripts. The total number of objects on display is around 15,000 objects.

Nag Hammadi Library 
The Coptic Museum also houses a corpus of 1,200 Nag Hammadi manuscripts in a library open to specialist researchers only.

See also
Coptic art
Coptic Orthodox Church
Coptic history
Coptology

References

External links 
 Official Coptic Museum website (in English)
 Coptic Museum's Facebook Page
 Page about the museum on Coptic Cairo website (in English)
 
 Kamel, Seif. Coptic Museum in Cairo. Tour Egypt.

Further reading 

Simaika, Samir M. (2010). Markus Pasha Simaika. His life and times. (1st ed.) Cairo: Farid Atiya Press.

 

1910 establishments in Egypt
Museums established in 1910
Museums in Cairo
History museums in Egypt
Culture in Cairo
Coptic Orthodox Church
Old Cairo
Coptic Cairo
Religious museums in Egypt
Ethnic museums in Egypt
20th-century religious buildings and structures in Egypt